The Jagst Valley Railway is a 39.1-kilometre-long, single tracked narrow gauge railway in the north of the German state of Baden-Württemberg that was closed between 1988 and 2021. It has a railway gauge of 750 millimetres.

In the meantime, the narrow gauge railway was run by the German Railway Operating Company (Deutsche Eisenbahn-Betriebs-Gesellschaft or DEBG), later the Southwest German Railway Company (SWEG Südwestdeutsche Landesverkehr-GmbH or SWEG) and then the German Railway History Company (DGEG). The latest inaugural service as a museum railway, this time under the leadership of the "Friends of the Jagst Valley Railway (Jagsttalbahnfreunde), took place in November 2021 on the first section of the route in Dörzbach.

The Jagst Valley Railway and the Öchsle (former DB narrow-gauge railway from Biberach (a.d. Riß) via Warthausen to Ochsenhausen) are the last surviving operational routes of the once extensive Württemberg 750 mm narrow-gauge railways.

Literature

Film 
 Eisenbahn-Romantik, Folge 243: Die Jagsttalbahn, (SWR)

External links 

 Website des Jagsttalbahnfreunde e. V.
 Jagsttalbahn bei verkehrsrelikte.de
 Kursbuchauszug von 1944
 Bildergalerie mit historischen Aufnahmen aus Betriebszeiten bei Bahninfos-Bw
 Streckenbeschreibung bei vergessene-bahnen.de

References 

Railway lines in Baden-Württemberg
Hohenlohe (district)
Heilbronn (district)